Gerald John Morrison Munro (November 20, 1897 – January 28, 1968) was a Canadian ice hockey player who played two seasons in the National Hockey League for the Montreal Maroons and the Toronto St. Pats between 1924 and 1926. The rest of his career, which lasted from 1919 to 1931, was mainly spent in the amateur senior Northern Ontario Hockey Association and minor American Hockey Association.

Personal life
Munro was born in Sault Ste. Marie, Ontario and married Florence M. Cameron in 1925 at Sault Ste. Marie, Michigan. He died in Sudbury, Ontario in 1968 and was buried at Park Lawn Cemetery. His wife, Florence died in 1958.

Career statistics

Regular season and playoffs

References

External links
 

1897 births
1968 deaths
Canadian ice hockey defencemen
Chicago Cardinals (ice hockey) players
Detroit Greyhounds players
Ice hockey people from Ontario
Kansas City Pla-Mors players
Minneapolis Millers (AHA) players
Montreal Maroons players
Sportspeople from Sault Ste. Marie, Ontario
Toronto St. Pats players
Winnipeg Maroons players